Ada Pometti (born 13 May 1955) is an Italian film, television and stage actress.

Life and career
Born Nunzia Agata Pometti in Catania, Sicily, she graduated from the Centro Sperimentale di Cinematografia in Rome, and  she worked at the Teatro Stabile di Catania. A character actress, she was sometimes credited with the names Priscilla Benson and Ada Pomeroy.

Selected filmography
 His Name Was King (1971)
 Il sindacalista (1972)
 The Killer Is on the Phone (1972)
 Women in Cell Block 7 (1973)
 Property Is No Longer a Theft (1973)
 La via dei babbuini (1974)
 Commissariato di notturna (1974)
 Il caso Raoul (1975) 
 The Exorcist: Italian Style (1975)  
 Savage Three (1975)
 Cagliostro (1975)
 L'Italia s'è rotta  (1976)
 Basta che non si sappia in giro (1976)
 Zanna Bianca e il grande Kid (1977)
 Il Capo dei Capi (TV Mini-Series, 2007)  
 Il tredicesimo apostolo (TV Series, 2014)

References

External links
 

Italian film actresses
Italian stage actresses
Italian television actresses
Actors from Catania
Centro Sperimentale di Cinematografia alumni
1942 births
Living people
20th-century Italian actresses
21st-century Italian actresses